Associazione Sportiva Roma did not repeat its Coppa Italia victory from the previous season, but retained its status as the top team from the Capital with fifth in the league standings. Roma's main struggle was its inability to seal matches by a close margin, drawing on 14 occasions, and it neither had a watertight defence, nor a fearsome attack. Despite those shortcomings, Roma was only three points behind Torino for third.

Players

Goalkeepers
  Giovanni Cervone
  Giuseppe Zinetti

Defenders
  Aldair
  Antonio Comi
  Marco De Marchi
  Luigi Garzya
  Gabriele Grossi
  Sebastiano Nela
  Stefano Pellegrini
  Dario Rossi
  Antonio Tempestilli

Midfielders
  Walter Bonacina
  Amedeo Carboni
  Fabrizio Di Mauro
  Giuseppe Giannini
  Thomas Häßler
  Giovanni Piacentini
  Fausto Salsano

Forwards
  Andrea Carnevale
  Roberto Muzzi
  Ruggiero Rizzitelli
  Rudi Völler

Competitions

Overall

Last updated: 24 May 1992

Supercoppa Italiana

Serie A

League table

Results summary

Results by round

Matches

Coppa Italia

Second round

Round of 16

Quarter-finals

European Cup Winners' Cup

First round

Second round

Quarter-finals

Statistics

Goalscorers
  Rudi Völler 7 (1)
  Ruggiero Rizzitelli 6
  Giuseppe Giannini 4
  Andrea Carnevale 4
  Thomas Häßler 3
  Aldair 3
  Fabrizio Di Mauro 3

References

A.S. Roma seasons
Roma